Pond Life is a 2018 drama film written by Richard Cameron and directed by Bill Buckhurst. It stars Esmé Creed-Miles, Tom Varey, Angus Imrie, Daisy Edgar-Jones, Abraham Lewis, Ethan Wilkie and Gianluca Gallucci. The music was produced by Richard Hawley.

It tells the story  of a group of young friends who embark on a life changing fishing trip in the summer of 1994.

Cast 
 Tom Varey as Trev
 Esmé Creed-Miles as Pogo
 Angus Imrie as Malcolm
 Daisy Edgar-Jones as Cassie
 Abraham Lewis as Maurice
 Ethan Wilkie as Dave
 Gianluca Gallucci as Shane
 Shaun Dooley as Rus
 Siân Brooke as Pogo's Mum
 Sally Lindsay as Irene
 Siobhan Finneran as Kath
 Faye McKeever as Tracey
 Julie Hesmondhalgh as Muriel
 Adrian Hood as Billy
 Steve Garti as Kenny

Production 
Pond Life was released by Verve Pictures in 2019 and produced by Open Palm Films as part of the original slate of films announced in 2017 by founder Dominic Dromgoole. The screenplay was adapted by Richard Cameron from his original stage play, of the same name, which debuted at The Bush in 1992 when Dromgoole was artistic director. Pond Life is director Bill Buckhurst's feature debut. Buckhurst was first introduced to Dromgoole while working at Shakespeare's Globe where he directed eight productions from 2012.

Reception 
Pond Life premiered at the Glasgow International Film Festival 2019. It received  rating on Rotten Tomatoes from  reviews. The Times reported that, "The depictions of sunburnt teenagers ambling through estates, obsessing over crushes and minor betrayals, yet haunted by the terrible truths of the adult world, seemed utterly true."

References

External links 
 
 

2018 films
British drama films
2010s English-language films
2010s British films